The Royal American is a 1927 American silent action adventure film directed by Harry Joe Brown and starring Reed Howes, Nita Martan and Billy Franey. Produced by Brown's own production company, it was distributed by the independent Rayart Pictures, the forerunner of Monogram Pictures.

Synopsis
A young coast guard becomes involved with an altercation with the crew of a ship and finds himself shanghaied aboard. The ship turns out to be gunrunning armaments to South American revolutionaries.

Cast
 Reed Howes as Jack Beaton
 Nita Martan as 	Gail Morton
 Billy Franey as 	Mike
 David Kirby as 	Pat
 J.P. McGowan as 	Capt. Burke
 Hal Salter as 	First Mate Dorgan
 Rosa Gore as Mother Meg

References

Bibliography
 Connelly, Robert B. The Silents: Silent Feature Films, 1910-36, Volume 40, Issue 2. December Press, 1998.
 Munden, Kenneth White. The American Film Institute Catalog of Motion Pictures Produced in the United States, Part 1. University of California Press, 1997.

External links
 

1920s American films
1927 films
1920s action adventure films
1920s English-language films
American silent feature films
American action adventure films
American black-and-white films
Films directed by Harry Joe Brown
Rayart Pictures films
Films about the United States Coast Guard
Silent action adventure films